Jalan Tun Fuad Stephens or Kota Kinabalu Coastal Highway is a major highway in Kota Kinabalu city, Sabah, Malaysia. The highway was built at the reclamation land in the year 1990s and it was part of the Kota Kinabalu coastal development project. It was named after Sabah's first chief minister and state Yang di-Pertua Negeri (Governor), Tun Fuad Stephens (Donald Stephens).

List of interchanges 

Highways in Malaysia